WNTW may refer to:

Radio stations
 WJFN (AM), a radio station (820 AM) licensed to serve Chester, Virginia, United States, which held the call sign WNTW from 2014 to 2020
 WNTI, a radio station (990 AM) licensed to serve Somerset, Pennsylvania, United States, which held the callsign from 2004 to 2013
 WXVA, a radio station (610 AM) licensed to serve Winchester, Virginia, which held the callsign from 1993 to 2002

Television show
 What Not to Wear (U.S. TV series)